Test cricket is the longest version of the sport of cricket. Test matches are played between international teams of eleven players each over four innings; each team bats twice. In the women's variant, the game is scheduled to last four days of play. The Women's Cricket Association was formed in England in 1926, and the first women's Test was played between England and Australia in 1934. The English team were on a tour of Australia and New Zealand, arranged by the WCA. The International Women's Cricket Council was formed in 1958 as the governing body for women's cricket. In 2005, women's cricket was brought under the International Cricket Council along with men's cricket; at that time 89 of the council's 104 members had started developing women's cricket. As of June 2022, a total of ten teams have played a total of 144 women's Test matches and 2 matches were abandoned. England have played the most matches (98) while Sri Lanka, Ireland and the Netherlands have played only one Test each.

A century is a score of a hundred or more runs in an innings. The first century in women's Test cricket was scored in 1935 by Myrtle Maclagan, who made 119 runs for England against Australia. Since then, a total of 108 centuries, including seven double centuries, have been scored. Betty Snowball of England (189 runs) held the record for the highest individual score for over 51 years. She was the second cricketer to hold the record after Maclagan, a record which stood until Sandhya Agarwal of India surpassed it by a single run in 1986. Following Agarwal the record was held by Denise Annetts (Australia, 1987), Kirsty Flavell (New Zealand, 1996), Karen Rolton (Australia, 2001), Mithali Raj (India, 2002), and the current record holder Kiran Baluch of Pakistan who, in 2004, scored 242 runs against the West Indies. Janette Brittin of England has scored five centuries in a Test career spanning 27 matches and 44 innings, the most hundreds in women's Test match history. Flavell scored the first double century in women's Test cricket in 1996; over the next eight years five more double centuries were scored, by Joanne Broadbent (Australia, 1998), Michelle Goszko (Australia, 2001), Karen Rolton (Australia, 2001), Mithali Raj (India, 2002), and Kiran Baluch (Pakistan, 2004), which was then succeeded by a 13 year wait until Ellyse Perry of Australia scored the next one in 2017. , Australia and England have the most centurions (23 players each) while English players have scored the most centuries (44 times).

The first part of this list includes all players who have scored a Test century. The list is organised in chronological order; in cases where more than one player has scored a century in the same match or innings, the player who started batting earlier is listed first. The second part of the list provides an overview of century scores by Test playing teams. Teams are listed in the order of debut; in cases where two teams played their first match together, the host team is listed first.

Key

Century scores

Team overview

References

Bibliography
 

!
Test cricket records
Women's test